John McKenzie (born c. 1963) is a former American football player and coach.  He is the head football coach at Paul W. Bryant High School in Tuscaloosa, Alabama, a position he has held since 2023.  He served as the head football coach at Delaware State University from 1997 to 1999, compiling a record of 7–26.  A native of Miami, Florida, McKenzie played college football as a quarterback at Jackson State University.

Head coaching record

College

References

Year of birth missing (living people)
1960s births
Living people
American football quarterbacks
Alabama A&M Bulldogs football coaches
Alabama State Hornets football coaches
Alcorn State Braves football coaches
Delaware State Hornets football coaches
Fayetteville State Broncos football coaches
Jackson State Tigers football coaches
Jackson State Tigers football players
North Carolina A&T Aggies football coaches
High school football coaches in Florida
High school football coaches in Mississippi
Players of American football from Miami
Sports coaches from Miami
Coaches of American football from Florida
African-American coaches of American football
African-American players of American football
20th-century African-American sportspeople
21st-century African-American sportspeople